Gregory or Greg Mathew, Mathews, or Matthews may refer to:

Greg Matthews (born 1959), Australian cricketer
Greg Matthews (politician), American politician
Greg Mathew, Australian reality show contestant
Greg Mathews (baseball) (born 1962), baseball player
Gregory Mathews (1876–1949), ornithologist